Carol Berg (born 1948) is the author of fantasy novels, including the books from the Rai-Kirah series, Song of the Beast, the books from The Bridge of D'Arnath series, the Lighthouse novels, and Collegia Magica. She also writes the Chimera series under the pen name Cate Glass.

Berg holds a degree in mathematics from Rice University, and a degree in computer science from the University of Colorado. Before writing full-time, she designed software. She lives in Colorado, and is the mother of three boys.

Bibliography

The Rai-Kirah series 
 Transformation (2000)
 Revelation (2001)
 Restoration (2002)

The Bridge of D'Arnath series
 Son of Avonar (2004)
 Guardians of the Keep (2004)
 The Soul Weaver (2005)
 Daughter of Ancients (2005)

The Lighthouse Duet
 Flesh and Spirit (2007)
 Breath and Bone (2008), the winner of the 2008 Colorado Book Award and the 2009 Mythopoeic Fantasy Award

The Sanctuary Duet
In the same setting as The Lighthouse Duet.

 Dust and Light (2014)
 Ash and Silver (2015)

Novels of the Collegia Magica
 The Spirit Lens (2010)
 The Soul Mirror (2011), the winner of the 2011 Colorado Book Award
 The Daemon Prism (2012)

The Chimera series (as Cate Glass) 

 An Illusion of Thieves (2019)
 A Conjuring of Assassins (2020)
 A Summoning of Demons (2021)

Other works
 Song of the Beast, fantasy standalone (2003) and winner of the 2003 Colorado Book Award
"Unmasking", a novella set in the world of the Rai-kirah in the collection Elemental Magic (2007)
 "At Fenwick Faire", a gritty myth; in Broken Links, Mended Lives, RMFW Press (2009) 
 "Seeds", a short story set in the kingdom of Navronne; in Blackguards: Tales of Assassins, Mercenaries and Rogues, Ragnarok Publications (2015)
"The Heart's Coda," novelette follow-up to Song of the Beast; in Lace and Blade 4, Marion Zimmer Bradley Literary Trust (2018)

Awards
Finalist, (2001) Compton Crook Award, Transformation
Finalist, (2000) Barnes & Noble Maiden Voyage Award, Transformation
Finalist, (2002) Romantic Times Reviewers' Choice Award for Best Epic Fantasy, Restoration
Winner, (2003) Colorado Book Award, Song of the Beast
Winner, (2005) Geffen Award for Best Translated Fantasy, Transformation
Finalist, (2006) RWA-FFP Prism Award for Best Romantic Fantasy, Daughter of Ancients
Finalist, (2006) Colorado Book Award, Daughter of Ancients
Finalist, (2008) Colorado Book Award, Flesh and Spirit
Winner, (2009) Colorado Book Award, Breath and Bone
Winner, (2009) Mythopoeic Fantasy Award for Adult Literature, Flesh and Spirit,Breath and Bone
Finalist, (2010) Colorado Book Award, The Spirit Lens
Winner, (2011) Colorado Book Award, The Soul Mirror

References

External links

 Blog
 
 Carol Berg at FantasyLiterature.net
 Interview at SFFWorld
 

American fantasy writers
American women novelists
20th-century American novelists
21st-century American novelists
Novelists from Colorado
Living people
Rice University alumni
University of Colorado alumni
Women science fiction and fantasy writers
20th-century American women writers
21st-century American women writers
1948 births